The Old Doctor's Humanity is a 1912 silent film short produced by the Éclair American Company and distributed by the Universal Film Manufacturing Company.

A copy is preserved in the Library of Congress.

Cast
Will E. Sheerer

References

External links
The Old Doctor's Humanity at IMDb.com

1912 films
American silent short films
Universal Pictures short films
American black-and-white films
1912 short films
1912 drama films
Silent American drama films
1910s American films
American drama short films